Carlos Leonardo Barra Díaz (born 6 November 1968 in Entabladero, Veracruz) is a Mexican professional football manager and former player, who is the current assistant manager of Liga MX club Monterrey.

Playing career 

The debut of Carlos Barra was the play-off with Veracruz on Saturday, 11 November 1989.

Coaching career

Veracruz 

His first experience as technical director in the Liga MX was in the Clausura 2007, as an internship with Veracruz, on 17 February 2007, when he directed a team against the San Luis and won.

Monterrey 

Failing to reach an agreement in the Torneo de Clausura 2009 with La Volpe, the club Monterrey offered the opportunity of managing the team to Víctor Manuel Vucetich and Barra served as his assistant. After several years of success, during the 2013 Apertura tournament, Vucetich was stopped and, as a consequence, Carlos Barra was handed over the direction of the team.

In the middle of the 2014 Clausura tournament José Guadalupe Cruz was invited by Monterrey to relieve the managing of the team, together with Jose Treviño. After obtaining good results during the rest of the tournament, and after a failed attempt by Monterrey to hire another coach, Barra was announced as the coach definitively for the 2014 Apertura tournament, on 16 May 2014.

On 15 February 2015, Barra was sacked from Monterrey due to poor results in Clausura 2015.

Honours
Cruz Azul
Mexican Primera División: Invierno 1997
Copa México: 1996–97
CONCACAF Champions' Cup: 1996, 1997

References 

1968 births
Living people
Footballers from Veracruz
Association football midfielders
Mexican footballers
Mexico international footballers
C.D. Veracruz footballers
Atlético Morelia players
Cruz Azul footballers
Mexican football managers
C.D. Veracruz managers
C.F. Monterrey managers
Mexican expatriate football managers
Mexican expatriate sportspeople in Spain
C.F. Monterrey non-playing staff
C.D. Guadalajara non-playing staff
C.D. Veracruz non-playing staff